Sanjukta Morcha alternatively Sanyukta Morcha, is a political alliance formed ahead of the 2021 West Bengal Legislative Assembly election as an alternative to the Trinamool Congress and the Bharatiya Janata Party. It was led by Communist Party of India (Marxist) and Indian National Congress and Indian Secular Front with other smaller parties of Left Front (West Bengal) during the 2021 elections. After the election, Adhir Ranjan Chowdhury, the head of Congress, declared the end of any alliance with Indian Secular Front Later on CPI(M) general secretary Sitaram Yechury said the electoral alliances was over after the polls, but the political understanding between Left, Congress and ISF will continue.

Background
Following the heavy defeats in the 2011 Assembly equations and the 2014 Indian national election, the party welcomed ideas of the alliance even with parties not conforming to the communist manifesto. The first signs came when in the Siliguri municipal election, CPI(M) made some local understanding with INC resulting in CPI(M) leader Ashok Bhattacharya being appointed as the mayor. This success got popularity as Siliguri Model.

After the success of the model, in the long run, some Congress and CPI(M) leader advocated for a Left-Congress alliance. This gradually materialized into "Alliance" between INC and Left Front in all the seats except in Murshidabad district.

After much dispute and secession of SUCI(C) and CPI(ML) from Left Front, both Congress and Lefts formed a basis of what they called "seat sharing", strongly objecting to the use of the word-"alliance".

Left Front consisting of CPI(M), CPI, RSP and All India Forward Bloc along with INC (Congress) (who were on an Electoral agreement with the Left Front) released their respective candidate list in several rounds after consultations and bargaining.

In 2016 Secular Democratic Alliance or locally known as Mahajot was formed on the broad agreement that some political parties proposed before the 2016 West Bengal Legislative Assembly election for fighting against Trinamool Congress government in West Bengal, India. Subsequently, Mahajot succeeded to Samyukta Morcha in 2021.

2021 Legislative assembly election
Ahead of the 2021 West Bengal Legislative Assembly election, Indian Secular Front joined the alliance with Left Front and Indian National Congress. The alliance was announced in a rally of Left Front (West Bengal) in the Brigade Parade Ground. The Left Parties will contest in 165 seats, Congress in 92 and ISF in 37 seats.

Despite a spirited campaign, the Left Front and the Indian National Congress drew a blank in the election with a considerable decrease in their respective vote shares and the Indian Secular Front (contesting in the name and symbol of the Rashtriya Secular Majlis Party) wrested the Bhangar Assembly constituency from the All India Trinamool Congress.

2023 and 2024 elections
The Left Front supported Indian National Congress candidate Bayron Biswas for by-election in Sagardighi Assembly constituency.

On 2 March 2023, CPI(M) state secretary Mohammed Salim, in a press meeting, said that smaller anti-TMC and anti-BJP forces including the Indian Secular Front supported INC candidate Bayron Biswas. He also added that alliance of Left and Centrist forces and other parties will continue in 2023 Panchayat elections and 2024 parliamentary elections.

Members

Notes

References

Defunct political party alliances in India
Politics of West Bengal